Bradley James Currie (born 8 November 1998) is a Scottish cricketer. In May 2022, he was named in Scotland's squad as a travelling reserve player for the 2022 United States Tri-Nation Series.

Currie made his first-class debut on 19 July 2022, for Sussex in the 2022 County Championship, taking bowling figures of 6/93 on his debut at Lord's. He made his List A debut on 2 August 2022, for Sussex in the 2022 Royal London One-Day Cup.

References

External links
 

1998 births
Living people
English cricketers
Scottish cricketers
Sussex cricketers
Dorset cricketers
People from Poole
People educated at Poole Grammar School
People educated at Millfield
Alumni of Bournemouth University